James Edward Nill (born April 11, 1958) is a Canadian former ice hockey player and the current general manager of the Dallas Stars of the National Hockey League (NHL). Nill played in the NHL throughout the 1980s with the St. Louis Blues, Vancouver Canucks, Boston Bruins, Winnipeg Jets, and Detroit Red Wings, retiring in 1990. Prior to making his NHL debut Nill also played for Canada at the 1980 Winter Olympics. He worked as a scout for the Ottawa Senators before joining the Red Wings in an executive role in 1994, staying with the team before moving to take up the general manager role with Dallas in 2013.

Playing career

Junior
Born in Hanna, Alberta, Nill played one season for the Drumheller Falcons of the Alberta Junior Hockey League (AJHL) in 1975, after which he played three seasons with the Medicine Hat Tigers of the WCHL. He was drafted by the St. Louis Blues in the third round, 89th overall, in the 1978 NHL Amateur Draft.

International
The next season, Nill played with the University of Calgary before signing with the Canadian national team for 1979–80. Nill scored 32 points in 45 exhibition games before playing six games, scoring one goal and two assists, for Canada at the 1980 Lake Placid Olympics.

Professional
Nill played one season for the Salt-Lake Golden Eagles of the Central Hockey League (CHL) in 1980–81. He finally made his NHL debut in 1982 for the St. Louis Blues. He only played one season for the Blues before being traded to the Vancouver Canucks with Tony Currie, Rick Heinz and St. Louis' fourth-round draft pick (Shawn Kilroy) in the 1982 NHL Entry Draft in exchange for Glen Hanlon on March 9, 1982. He helped the Canucks to the 1982 Stanley Cup Finals where they would lose to the New York Islanders 4–0.

After two more seasons in Vancouver, Nill was traded to the Boston Bruins in exchange for Peter McNab on February 3, 1984. He did not receive very much ice time in Boston and consequently the Bruins ended up trading him to the Winnipeg Jets for Morris Lukowich on February 4, 1985. He played nearly four years for Winnipeg. However, they were not able to defeat the powerhouse Edmonton Oilers or the Calgary Flames. He was sent to the American Hockey League (AHL)'s Moncton Hawks. He did not stay in New Brunswick long as Detroit Red Wings head coach Jacques Demers liked his tough style of play and acquired him on January 11, 1988 in exchange for fellow journeyman NHLer Mark Kumpel.

Nill played the final three years of his NHL career in Detroit with brief stints for the AHL's Adirondack Red Wings. In Adirondack, he was a teammate of Sheldon Kennedy. He retired from professional hockey after 1991.

Management career

Ottawa and Detroit
After Nill retired as an active player, he joined the scouting staff of the Ottawa Senators as amateur scout. He was promoted to professional scout after only two years. He joined the Detroit Red Wings' front office in the summer of 1994 following his three-year stint with Ottawa.

Nill's duties with Detroit included directing their amateur scouting and selections at the annual NHL Entry Draft. He had also served as the general manager of the Adirondack Red Wings.

Nill continued to oversee the development of the Red Wings' prospects that are currently assigned to Detroit's main affiliate, the Grand Rapids Griffins of the AHL, as well as those in the Canadian junior and European leagues.

In his management role with the Detroit Red Wings, he helped the team to four Stanley Cup Championships in 1997, 1998, 2002 and 2008.

Dallas Stars
In April 2013, Nill was hired as general manager of the Dallas Stars. He immediately made several major transactions, starting with trading a sixth-round pick in the 2013 NHL Entry Draft to the Ottawa Senators in exchange for defenceman Sergei Gonchar, then signed Gonchar to a two-year, $10 million contract. On July 4, 2013, in a blockbuster trade, Nill sent 2011 NHL All-Star Loui Eriksson (as well as prospects Joe Morrow, Reilly Smith and Matt Fraser) to the Boston Bruins in exchange for former second overall pick Tyler Seguin as well as Rich Peverley and Ryan Button. On the same day, he traded prospect Philip Larsen and a seventh-round pick in the 2016 NHL Entry Draft to the Edmonton Oilers in exchange for their captain Shawn Horcoff.

On July 1, 2014, Nill traded for Ottawa centre and captain Jason Spezza and right winger Ludwig Karlsson in exchange for Alex Chiasson, Nick Paul, Alex Guptill and a second-round pick in the 2015 NHL Entry Draft. On the same day, he also signed unrestricted free agent forward Aleš Hemský to a three-year, $12 million contract.

On July 10, 2015, Nill traded for forward Patrick Sharp and defensive prospect Stephen Johns from the Chicago Blackhawks in exchange for defenceman Trevor Daley and forward Ryan Garbutt. On July 15, 2015, Nill signed unrestricted free agent defenceman Johnny Oduya to a two-year, $7.5 million contract.

Career statistics

Regular season and playoffs

International

References

External links 

1958 births
Living people
Adirondack Red Wings players
Boston Bruins players
Canadian ice hockey right wingers
Dallas Stars executives
Detroit Red Wings executives
Detroit Red Wings general managers
Detroit Red Wings players
Detroit Red Wings scouts
Ice hockey people from Alberta
Ice hockey players at the 1980 Winter Olympics
Medicine Hat Tigers players
Moncton Hawks players
National Hockey League executives
Olympic ice hockey players of Canada
Ottawa Senators scouts
People from Hanna, Alberta
St. Louis Blues draft picks
St. Louis Blues players
Salt Lake Golden Eagles (CHL) players
Stanley Cup champions
Vancouver Canucks players
Winnipeg Jets (1979–1996) players
Canadian expatriate ice hockey players in the United States